New Orleans Suite is a studio album by the American pianist, composer, and bandleader Duke Ellington, recorded and released on the Atlantic label in 1970. The album contains the final recordings of longtime Ellington saxophonist Johnny Hodges, who died between the album's two recording sessions. The album won a Grammy Award in 1971 for Best Jazz Performance by a Big Band.

The suite was commissioned by George Wein for the 1970 New Orleans Jazz Festival.

Reception

Dan Morgenstern's glowing review of the album in 1971 for DownBeat awarded it five stars. "The music is evocative, highly atmospheric and marked throughout by the gorgeous ensemble textures that set this orchestra apart from every other big band in the history of jazz", he wrote. "This is a great record, and by any standard one of the major musical events of 1971." Morgenstern had praise for several of the soloists, especially Johnny Hodges (in his swan song), Paul Gonsalves' "profoundly emotional" tribute to both Sidney Bechet and Hodges, Cootie Williams, Norris Turney, and Harold Ashby.

In his review for Sounds, Jack Hutton remarked that "a Creole influence permeates the work, a lazy Delta feel laden with nostalgic sadness which is a probably a truer reflection of the historic city than the good-time trad which has helped to popularise it." He praised the solos of Norris Turney, criticized those of Cootie Williams, and concluded that "This suite, while it doesn't rank with Ellington's greatest works, proves that the piano player is still vitally creative well into his seventies."

The Penguin Guide to Jazz includes the album as part of its suggested "Core Collection," and awards it a four-star rating.

Track listing
All compositions by Duke Ellington.

 "Blues for New Orleans" - 7:40  
 "Bourbon Street Jingling Jollies" - 4:00  
 "Portrait of Louis Armstrong" - 3:02  
 "Thanks for the Beautiful Land on the Delta" - 3:38  
 "Portrait of Wellman Braud" - 4:05  
 "Second Line" - 6:00  
 "Portrait of Sidney Bechet" - 3:55  
 "Aristocracy a la Jean Lafitte" - 3:57  
 "Portrait of Mahalia Jackson" - 4:53

Recorded at National Recording Studio in New York, NY on April 27 (tracks 1, 2, 4, 6 & 8) and May 13 (tracks 3, 5, 7 & 9), 1970.

Personnel
 Duke Ellington – piano
 Cootie Williams – trumpet
 Fred Stone – trumpet
 Money Johnson, Al Rubin – trumpet (tracks 1, 2, 4, 6 & 8)
 Cat Anderson – trumpet (tracks 3, 5, 7 & 9)
 Booty Wood – trombone
 Julian Priester – trombone
 Dave Taylor – bass trombone (tracks 1, 2, 4, 6 & 8)
 Chuck Connors – bass trombone (tracks 3, 5, 7 & 9)
 Russell Procope – alto saxophone, clarinet
 Johnny Hodges – alto saxophone (tracks 1, 2, 4, 6 & 8)
 Norris Turney – alto saxophone, clarinet, flute
 Harold Ashby – tenor saxophone, clarinet
 Paul Gonsalves – tenor saxophone
 Harry Carney – baritone saxophone, clarinet, bass clarinet
 Wild Bill Davis – organ (track 1)
 Joe Benjamin – bass
 Rufus Jones – drums

References

1970 albums
Atlantic Records albums
Duke Ellington albums
Grammy Award for Best Large Jazz Ensemble Album